A straw man is a form of argument and an informal fallacy.

Straw man may also refer to:

General
 Straw man (dummy), a dummy made from straw
 Straw man (law), in law, a third party that acts as a front in a transaction
 Straw man proposal, in business and software development, a simple draft proposal to generate discussion
 Strawman theory, a pseudolegal theory in the sovereign citizen, tax protester, freeman, and redemption movements

Publications
 Straw Man (novel), a 1951 novel by Doris Miles Disney
 The Straw Man, a 1957 novel by Jean Giono
 Straw Man (comics), a 1975 Marvel Comics character
 Straw Men (novel), a 2001 novel by Martin J. Smith
 The Straw Men, a 2002 novel by Michael Marshall

Film
 The Straw Man (film), a 1953 British film

Music
 "Strawman", a 1989 song by Lou Reed from New York
 "Straw Man", a 2019 song by Silversun Pickups from Widow's Weeds

See also 
 Corn dolly, a humanoid figure woven from plant stems
 Man of Straw (disambiguation)
 Scarecrow (disambiguation)
 Der Untertan, a 1918 novel by Heinrich Mann
 Der Untertan (film), a 1951 East German film
 Wicker man (disambiguation)